Walter George Halsall (29 March 1912 – March 1996) was an English professional footballer who made 84 appearances in the First Division of the Football League playing for Blackburn Rovers and Birmingham.

Life and career
Halsall was born in Liverpool. As a young man he played as an amateur for various clubs in the Lancashire area. In the 1931–32 season, Marine reached the final of the FA Amateur Cup, the first time the club had progressed further than the last eight. Halsall scored the winning goal in the semi-final to defeat Yorkshire Amateurs, and played in the final, which Marine lost 7–1 to Dulwich Hamlet.

In December 1932 he signed for Blackburn Rovers, initially as an amateur, turning professional a few months later. He gained a reputation for an elegant style of play, but when the club signed Charlie Calladine from Birmingham in 1936, the two players were in competition for the same position, and Halsall's appearances became less frequent. He was released after the 1937–38 season and joined Birmingham, where the local press described him as a "tall, stylish player with the heart to do two men's work". After one season Birmingham were relegated from the First Division, and Halsall joined Chesterfield for a fee of £875, but never played a league game for them before the Football League was suspended in September 1939.

Halsall retired from football during the Second World War and became a commercial traveller. He died in Sefton South in March 1996.

References

1912 births
1996 deaths
English footballers
Association football midfielders
Liverpool F.C. players
Marine F.C. players
Burscough F.C. players
Bolton Wanderers F.C. players
Blackburn Rovers F.C. players
Birmingham City F.C. players
Chesterfield F.C. players
English Football League players
Footballers from Liverpool